Etah district is one of the districts of Uttar Pradesh, India, since 1854. Etah City is the district headquarters. Etah district is a part of Aligarh Division.

About 
According to the 2011 census Etah district has a population of 1,761,152. This gives it a ranking of 272nd in India (out of a total of 640 Districts). The district has a population density of 717 inhabitants per square kilometre (1,860 /sq mi) . Its population growth rate over the decade 2001-2011 was 12.77%. Etah has a sex ratio of 863 females for every 1000 males, and a literacy rate of 73.27%.

History 
The city lies in the cultural region of Braj and was a part of the Surasena Mahajanapada during the Vedic Age. It was subsequently ruled by the bigger kingdoms like the Mauryas, Guptas, Scythians, Kushans, Indo-greeks before falling into the hands of localYadav rulers.

It is the midpoint on the Kanpur-Delhi Highway. Historically, it is also known for being a centre of the Revolt of 1857. In ancient times, Etah was called “Aintha” which means ‘to respond aggressively’ because of the people of the yadav community, who are very aggressive. It was when the king of Awagarh went hunting in the forest along with his 2 dogs. The dogs saw a fox and started barking and chasing it. The fox kept on running away trying to protect itself from the king's dogs but when it reached Etah, the fox responded very aggressively to the king's dogs. The King was surprised by the behavioural change in the fox. So, he thought that this place must have something which made the fleeing fox change attitude.

Therefore, the place was called Aintha, which later was mispronounced as Etah.

Geography 
Eta is located at 27.63 ° N 78.67 ° E.  [4] It has an average elevation of 170 m (557 ft). The Eisen River flows behind the village Ghazipur Pahor. Etah is a district in the Aligarh division of Uttar Pradesh province, India.  It is bounded by Kasganj in the north, Mainpuri and Firozabad in the south, Farrakhabad in the east and Aligarh, Hathras, Mathura and Agra districts in the west.  Which come in Uttar Pradesh.  The district does not have a border with any other state.

Demographics 

According to the 2011 census Etah district has a population of 1,774,480. This gives it a ranking of 272nd in India (out of a total of 640). Its population growth rate over the decade 2001-2011 was 12.77%. Etah has a sex ratio of 863 females for every 1000 males, and a literacy rate of 73.27%. Scheduled Castes made up 15.83% of the population.

Hindi is the predominant language, spoken by 99.04% of the population. The local dialect is Braj in the west, which slowly changes to Kannauji in the east.

Civic administration 

Etah is one of the 75 administrative Districts of Uttar Pradesh with its headquarters located at Etah. As in the case of all other Districts of the country, the Collector and District Magistrate is the administrative head of Etah District. As per provisional population figures of 2011 Census:
Area: 4,446 km2

No. of municipal bodies: 9

No. of Nyay Panchayats: 72

No. of Tehsils: 4

No. of Parliamentary Constituency: 3

Division: ALIGARH Division

Jalesar, Awagarh Come Under Agra Division

No. of Blocks: 8

No. of Gram Panchayats: 576

No. of Villages: 892

No. of Assembly: 4.

No. of Police station: 18.

Transport 

District has 8 Railway Station/Halt. Length of Railway Line in the district is 55 km. and it comes under North Central Railway zone.

Towns and villages are well equipped with a web of roads as it is the major way of transportation in the region. National Highway 91 (Delhi-Kolkata) pass from the middle of the district. Etah Bus Station is situated on National Highway 91. Uttar Pradesh State Road Transport Corporation operates buses to all cities in Uttar Pradesh.

Etah is well connected by road. It is located on National Highway 91.  You can reach it easily here. Uttar Pradesh Roadways bus is directly available from here to Agra, Aligarh, Delhi, Noida, Aliganj, Farrukhabad, Awagarh, Jalesar, Kasganj, Tundla, Shikohabad, Mainpuri, Etawah, Kanpur and Lucknow.

Economy 

There are no large industries here, but there are some factories here. Hindustan Unilever Ltd. Brass casting work is going on at Jalesar on a large scale.  Etah is an agricultural region. Farming is one of the main employments of the people of Etah. The land of Etah is very fertile Economy of Etah District is agrarian in character. The geography and the climate are favourable for production of crops like paddy, sugarcane, sunflower, oilseeds, etc. This town behaves as a nodal point for accumulation and marketing of such products. Except a few agro palaceprocessing.

Tourist places 
 Kailash Mandir
 Arsh Gurukul
 Awagarh Fort
 Atranji Khera
 Patna Bird Sanctuary
 Ram Darbaar
 Kali Mandir
 Mehta Park

Historical Places 
Ghantaghar
Shaheed Park

Development 

Work is under construction on the Jawaharpur super thermal power project ultra mega power plant here, work on the Tundla-Etah-Malawan new rail route is going on, Etah-Kasganj new track approved by the Railways in budget 2017–2018, work on Etah Medical College is underway, work on Etah Sewerage  Work is underway on Etah-Aligarh bypass, most of all main roads are under construction, some of Etah roads have recently been added to the national highway. Agra-Bareilly National Highway, Etah-Farrukhabad Highway.

Nearby districts 
 Kasganj district
 Hathras district
 Firozabad district
 Mainpuri district
 Farrukhabad district
 Agra district
 Aligarh district

References 

Etah district